Saypulla Atavovich Absaidov (born 14 July 1958 in Tarki, Dagestan ASSR) is a former Soviet wrestler of Kumyk descent and Olympic champion and World Champion 1981 in Freestyle wrestling.

Olympics
Absaidov competed at the 1980 Summer Olympics in Moscow where he received a gold medal in Freestyle wrestling, the lightweight class.

References

1958 births
Living people
Sportspeople from Makhachkala
Kumyks
Soviet male sport wrestlers
Olympic wrestlers of the Soviet Union
Wrestlers at the 1980 Summer Olympics
Russian male sport wrestlers
Olympic gold medalists for the Soviet Union
Olympic medalists in wrestling
Medalists at the 1980 Summer Olympics
Recipients of the Shohrat Order
Recipients of the Tereggi Medal
Honoured Masters of Sport of the USSR